Stewart Johonnot Oliver Alsop, Jr. (born January 7, 1952) is an American investor who is a partner in Alsop Louie Partners, a venture capital firm. He was a general partner with New Enterprise Associates in Menlo Park, California. He was an editor-in-chief and executive vice-president of InfoWorld, a weekly magazine for information-technology professionals.

Alsop previously founded Industry Publishing Company, which published a fortnightly newsletter for computer industry insiders and produced the Agenda and Demo conferences for executives of companies in the computer industry. Before 1985, Stewart served in several editorial positions at business and trade magazines, including Inc. Stewart received a Bachelor of Arts in English from Occidental College in 1975.
 
His father was Stewart Alsop; his uncle, Joseph Alsop. 

"Stewart Alsop has played a number of different roles in this business. Despite his considerable expertise, he works very hard to keep the perspective of the reasonable businessperson asking what exactly does this mean for me. It is very much in the intellectual tradition of his family to speak and write articulately about things in a way that makes sense to ordinary people."

Alsop's failed prediction on the death of the mainframe in the March 1991 issue of InfoWorld prompted a huge debate:

References

1952 births
Living people
American computer businesspeople
American magazine editors
Alsop family